The 2017 UCI Cyclo-cross World Championships were the World Championship for cyclo-cross for the season 2016–17. It was held in Bieles in Luxembourg on Saturday 28 and Sunday 29 January 2017. The championships featured five events; men's races for elite, under-23 and junior riders, and women's races for elite and under-23 riders.

Schedule

Saturday 28 January 2017
 11:00 Men's Junior
 13:00 Women's Under 23
 15:00 Women's Elite

Sunday 29 January 2017
 11:00 Men's Under 23
 15:00 Men's Elite

All times in local time (UTC+1).

Participants

Medal summary

Medalists

Medal table

References

External links
 

 
Uci Cyclo-cross World Championships, 2017
UCI Cyclo-cross World Championships
2017 in Luxembourgian sport
Cycle races in Luxembourg
International sports competitions hosted by Luxembourg
January 2017 sports events in Europe